Serbian-Slovak relations are foreign relations between Serbia and Slovakia. Both countries established direct diplomatic relations in 1993. Serbia has an embassy in Bratislava. Slovakia has an embassy in Belgrade.
Slovakia is among the few NATO and EU members which have not recognized the independence of Kosovo. Also Serbia is an EU candidate and Slovakia is an EU member.

History
Serbian-Slovak relations i.e. cooperation was especially good in the 18th and the 19th century, in the fields of culture, art, commerce, education, science, politics and military.

During the course of two centuries, more than 2500 Serbs were educated in various universities and higher institutions of learning in Slovakia, mostly in Bratislava, Košice and Kežmarok.

Noted Slovaks were active in the cultural and political life of Serbia, such as Pavel Jozef Šafárik, Ján Kollár and Ľudovít Štúr. Under the influence and drawing on the works of Serbian linguist Vuk Stefanović Karadžić, Pavel Jozef Šafárik and Jan Kolar decided to start collecting Slovak folk poems. During the 19th century, Serbian nationalists  and Slovak nationalists  supported each other and were active in spreading the ideas based on Slavophilia.

Serbian author and historian Risto Kovijanić researched Serbian-Slovak relations for over 50 years and published a number of works on the topic.

In February 2021 President of Serbia Aleksandar Vučić and Minister of Foreign Affairs Nikola Selaković held a meeting with Slovak Minister of Foreign and European Affairs Ivan Korčok.

Gallery

See also 
 Foreign relations of Serbia
 Foreign relations of Slovakia 
 Accession of Serbia to the European Union
 Czechoslovakia–Yugoslavia relations
 Croatia–Slovakia relations

Notes

References

External links
  Serbian Ministry of Foreign affairs about the relation with Slovakia
 Serbian embassy in Bratislava (in Serbian and Slovak only)
 Slovak embassy in Belgrade

 

 
Bilateral relations of Slovakia
Slovakia